Ihar Razhkow (born 24 June 1981) is a Belarusian professional football coach and former player.

International goal

Honours
Dinamo Minsk
 Belarusian Premier League champion: 2004
 Belarusian Cup winner: 2002–03

Shakhtyor Soligorsk
 Belarusian Cup winner: 2013–14

External links

1981 births
Living people
People from Mogilev
Sportspeople from Mogilev Region
Belarusian footballers
Association football midfielders
Belarus international footballers
Belarusian expatriate footballers
Ukrainian Premier League players
Expatriate footballers in Ukraine
Belarusian expatriate sportspeople in Ukraine
FC Veino players
FC Dnepr Mogilev players
FC Dinamo Minsk players
FC Kryvbas Kryvyi Rih players
FC Shakhtyor Soligorsk players
FC Belshina Bobruisk players
FC Dynamo Brest players
FC Gomel players
FC Slavia Mozyr players
FC Arsenal Dzerzhinsk players